Natatolana buzwilsoni is a species of crustacean in the family Cirolanidae, and was first described by Stephen John Keable in 2006. The species epithet, buzwilsoni, honours George ('Buz') Wilson.

It is a benthic species, living at depths of 37 - 83 m in tropical waters, on the north-west (continental) shelf off Western Australia.

References

External links
Natatolana buzwilsoni occurrence data from GBIF
Cymothoida
Crustaceans of Australia
Crustaceans described in 2006
Taxa named by Stephen John Keable